Scrobipalpa superstes is a moth in the family Gelechiidae. It was described by Povolný in 1977. It is found in southern Spain, Portugal, southern France and on Sardinia and Sicily.

The forewings are whitish to dirty whitish, dusted with grey scales. There are three blackish spots at the costa in the basal one-third. The hindwings are grey.

References

Scrobipalpa
Moths described in 1977
Taxa named by Dalibor Povolný